The 2007 World Men's Curling Championship (branded as 2007 Ford World Men's Curling Championship for sponsorship reasons) was held at Rexall Place in Edmonton, Alberta, Canada from March 31 to April 8. Team Canada skipped by Glenn Howard won the gold medal over Germany's Andy Kapp by a score of 8-3. This was Howard's third world championship, and his first as skip. Kapp claimed the silver for the second time in his career, and Team USA (skipped by Todd Birr) won the bronze medal, the first medal for the USA at the men's world championship since 1993.

The total attendance for the event was 184,970, a world championship record.

Teams

Round-robin standings

Final round-robin standings

Round-robin results

Draw 1
March 31, 12:30

Draw 2
March 31, 18:00

Draw 3
April 1, 08:30

Draw 4
April 1, 13:00

Draw 5
April 1, 19:30

Draw 6
April 2, 08:30

Draw 7
April 2, 13:00

Draw 8
April 2, 18:00

Draw 9
April 3, 08:30

Draw 10
April 3, 13:00

Draw 11
April 3, 18:00

Draw 12
April 4, 08:30

Draw 13
April 4, 13:00

Draw 14
April 4, 19:30

Draw 15
April 5, 08:30

Draw 16
April 5, 13:00

Draw 17
April 5, 18:00

Tiebreaker

Tie breaker 1
April 6, 9:00

Tie breaker 2
April 6, 14:00

Playoffs

1 vs. 2 game
April 6, 21:30

3 vs. 4 game
April 6, 21:30

Semifinal
April 7, 10:30

Gold medal game
April 8, 11:30

Player percentages

References

External links
 

World Men's Curling Championship
Ford World Mens Curling Championship, 2007
Curling competitions in Edmonton
International curling competitions hosted by Canada
2007 in Alberta
March 2007 sports events in Canada
April 2007 sports events in Canada
2000s in Edmonton